The following is the list of ministers with their portfolios in the Government of Punjab

Council of Ministers

References

Badal 04
1997 in India
1997 in Indian politics
Badal 03
Cabinets established in 1997
1997 establishments in Punjab, India